Juan Terrazas (5 December 1909 – 4 November 1947) was a Mexican footballer who represented his nation at the 1928 Summer Olympics in the Netherlands.

References

External links
 

1909 births
1947 deaths
Mexican footballers
Association football forwards
Footballers at the 1928 Summer Olympics
Olympic footballers of Mexico
Club América footballers
Mexico international footballers